Puggle is a crossbreed between a pug and a beagle. 

Puggle may also refer to:

The popular name given to a juvenile echidna or platypus, specifically, the period between hatching and weaning
A member of the Awana organization in the two- to three-year-old age group

See also
The Puggle Tales, a series of books by A. A. Barber of The Lost Forests
Peggle